Lake Waahi (or up to 1913 sometimes called Lake Waihi) is located immediately to the west of Huntly, in the Waikato Region. Lake Waahi is a riverine lake, which links to the Waikato River by way of the short Waahi Stream. The smaller Lake Puketirini lies immediately to Waahi's southeast.

The lake has a maximum depth of five metres and the open water covers approximately 522 hectares, though the lake extends further through marsh and fenland.

The lake is situated within predominantly pastoral land.

Pollution 
During the 1970s the lake had a healthy cover of macrophytes, but by 1981 the lake became supertrophic, with high turbidity and microscopic algae. Monitoring to 2004 showed no significant changes.

See also 
 List of lakes of New Zealand

References 

Lakes of Waikato
Waikato District